Agnieszka Marzenna Siwek-Jechowska (born May 21, 1962) is a former female track and field sprinter from Poland, who represented her native country at the 1988 Summer Olympics in Seoul, South Korea. She set her personal best (11.36 seconds) in the women's 100 metres event in 1988.

References

External links 
 
 
 

1962 births
Living people
Polish female sprinters
Athletes (track and field) at the 1988 Summer Olympics
Olympic athletes of Poland
Athletes from Warsaw
Olympic female sprinters